Justyne Caruana is a Maltese lawyer, politician, former Minister for Gozo and former Minister for Education. She was appointed on 9 June 2017 in the second cabinet of Joseph Muscat and reconfirmed by new Prime Minister Robert Abela before resigning one week later on 20 January 2020 and replaced with Clint Camilleri. After 11 months, she was re-appointed to Cabinet on 23 November 2020 as the new Minister for Education by Robert Abela. She then resigned from Minister for Education on 22 December 2021.

Political career 
She was first elected to Parliament in 2003 and successively in 2008, 2013 and 2017, always from her native Gozo constituency.  She served as the Parliamentary Secretary for Rights of Persons with Disability and Active Ageing from 2014 to 2017. In Opposition she was Spokesperson for Youth, Culture, Sports, Family, Children and Persons with Disability. Caruana was regional representative of the UK, British Isles and Mediterranean Region on the Steering Committee of the Commonwealth Women Parliamentarians and currently represents Malta on its Regional British Isles and Mediterranean Steering Committee. In 2016, Caruana was nominated as Malta's ambassador in the Women in Parliaments Global Forum.She is a member of Social Affairs Committee.

A Lawyer by profession, Caruana specialized in family law and canonical and civil litigation.

Controversies 
On the December 7, 2021 a 89 page ethics report compiled by the Standards Commissioner was released to the general public. It found that Caruana released a €15,000 contract to her friend Daniel Bogdanović to draft a report on ways to improve the National Sport School. The report also found that there was a "concentrated effort to hide Bogdanović's incompetence" and the work delivered was actually done by Paul Debattista, one of Caruana's consultants. The Maltese Prime Minister Robert Abela stopped the Bogdanović contract as soon as he became aware of it.

It was alleged that Caruana shared a romantic relationship with Bogdanović. Caruana did not reply to questions by media.

Caruana resigned from her position as Minister for Education on December 22, 2021. She was succeeded by Clifton Grima.

References 

Living people
Labour Party (Malta) politicians
Government ministers of Malta
21st-century Maltese women politicians
21st-century Maltese politicians
Women government ministers of Malta
Members of the House of Representatives of Malta
People from Gozo
Academic staff of the University of Malta
Year of birth missing (living people)